Lolo Peak is a mountain in the western United States, in the northern Rocky Mountains. It is located in the Bitterroot Range of western Montana in Missoula County, southwest of Missoula. 

East of Lolo Pass at the Idaho border, the peak is visible to the south from US 12, which runs between the pass and Traveler's Rest in the town of Lolo.

History
The name "Lolo" probably evolved from "Lou-Lou," a pronunciation of "Lawrence," a French-Canadian fur trapper killed by a grizzly bear and buried at Grave Creek. The first written evidence of the name "Lolo" appears in 1831 when Hudson's Bay Company fur trader John Work refers in his journal to Lolo Creek as "Lou Lou."

In an 1853 railroad survey and map, Lieutenant John Mullan spelled the creek and trail "Lou Lou." However, by 1865 the name was shortened to Lolo and is currently the name of a national forest, town, creek, mountain peak, mountain pass, and historic trail in west central Montana.

References

External links
 Lolo Days (Lolo's Annual Town Festival)
 "Friends of Lolo Peak"

Mountains of Missoula County, Montana
Mountains of Montana
Chinook Jargon place names